Panakkaari is a 1953 Indian Tamil-language drama film directed by K. S. Gopalakrishnan. Starring T. R. Rajakumari, M. G. Ramachandran and V. Nagayya, it is an adaptation of the 1877 novel Anna Karenina by Russian writer Leo Tolstoy.

Cast 
List adapted from the database of Film News Anandan

Male cast
M. G. Ramachandran
V. Nagayya
Javert Seetharaman
C. V. V. Panthulu
T. S. Durairaj
K. A. Thangavelu

Female cast
T. R. Rajakumari
(Yogam)-Mangalam
K. R. Chellam
T. S. Jaya

Production 
Panakkaari was based on Russian writer Leo Tolstoy's novel Anna Karenina. It was directed by K. S. Gopalakrishnan under the technical supervision of Newtone Studio founder Jiten Bannerjee.

Soundtrack 
The music of the film was composed by S. V. Venkatraman, with lyrics by Papanasam Sivan, Thanjai Ramaiah Das, Lakshmana Das and Kuyilan.

Release and reception 
Panakkaari was released on 1 May 1953. According to film historian Randor Guy, the film failed at the box office "mainly because of its ‘anti-sentimental’ storyline". During the same period, another film, Pitchaikkari, became a major commercial success; people in Madras would often joke, "Those who bought Panakkari became pitchaikkaarans (beggars), while buyers of Pitchaikkari became panakkarans (rich men)!"

Notes

References

External links 
 

1950s Tamil-language films
1953 drama films
1953 films
Films about infidelity
Films based on Anna Karenina
Films scored by S. V. Venkatraman
Indian drama films